Sebestyén is a Hungarian-language surname and given name, which is an equivalent of Sebastian. It may refer to:

Surname
 Balázs Sebestyén (born 1977), Hungarian television presenter 
 Béla Sebestyén (1885–1959), Hungarian football player
 Györgyi Sebestyén (born 1974), Hungarian football player
 János Sebestyén (1931–2012), Hungarian musician
 Júlia Sebestyén (born 1981), Hungarian figure skater
 Kati Sebestyén, Hungarian violinist
 László Sebestyén (born 1956) is a Hungarian engineer
 Márta Sebestyén (born 1957), Hungarian musician
 Péter Sebestyén (born 1994), Hungarian motorcyclist
 Victor Sebestyen (born 1956), Hungarian  historian

Given name
 Sebestyén, Archbishop of Esztergom (died 1007), Hungarian archbishop
 Sebestyén Ihrig-Farkas (born 1994), Hungarian football player
 Sebestyén Tinódi Lantos (1510–1556), Hungarian writer

Hungarian-language surnames